Stob Bàn may refer to:

 Stob Bàn (Grey Corries), a 977m Scottish mountain
 Stob Bàn (Mamores), a 999m Scottish mountain